Partridge Lake is a lake in Cochrane District in Northeastern Ontario, Canada. It is the source of the Partridge River from an outflow at middle of the east side of the lake; the Partridge River flows to James Bay. There are five unnamed inflows to the lake.

See also
List of lakes in Ontario

References

Other map sources:

Lakes of Cochrane District